Fencing has been contested at every Summer Olympic Games since the birth of the modern Olympic movement at the 1896 Summer Olympics in Athens. There are three forms of Olympic fencing:

Foil — a light thrusting weapon; the valid target is restricted to the torso; double touches are not allowed.
Épée — a heavy thrusting weapon; the valid target area covers the entire body; double touches are allowed.
Sabre — a light cutting and thrusting weapon; the valid target area includes almost everything above the waist (excluding the back of the head and the hands); double touches are not allowed.

Summary

Events

Men's

Women's

Past events

Nations
Numbers indicate the number of fencers each nation sent to that Olympics.

Medal table
Source: Accurate as of the conclusion of the 2020 Summer Olympics

See also

List of Olympic venues in fencing
Wheelchair fencing at the Summer Paralympics

References

 

 
Sports at the Summer Olympics
Olympic Games